East Liberty is an unincorporated community and census-designated place (CDP) located in Perry Township, Logan County, Ohio, United States. As of the 2010 census, it had a population of 366. It has a post office with the ZIP code 43319.

East Liberty was platted in 1834. A post office has been in operation at East Liberty since 1836. A Disciples of Christ minister, Alonzo Skidmore, organized the Central Ohio College at East Liberty in 1882. Formally established in the following year, it prospered before financial pressures forced its closure in the late 1890s.

The community is the location of a major Honda automotive production plant, East Liberty Auto Plant (opened in 1984), as well as the NHTSA's Vehicle Research and Testing Center, located at the independent proving ground Transportation Research Center.

Perry Township serves as the local government for the community and has a fire department located here.

Besides U.S. Route 33, significant roads in East Liberty include State Routes 292 and 347.

Geography 
East Liberty is located in southern Perry Township at 40°18'27.6" North, 83°35'10.4" West (40.307682, -83.586221). Otter Creek flows through the southern part of the community, leading northeast to Mill Creek, an east-flowing tributary of the Scioto River.

Demographics

References

External links
Transportation Research Center
Detailed Logan County map

Census-designated places in Ohio
Census-designated places in Logan County, Ohio
1834 establishments in Ohio
Populated places established in 1834